The Leeds Library is the oldest surviving subscription library of its type in the UK. It was founded in 1768, following an advertisement placed in the Leeds Intelligencer earlier that year. The first secretary was Joseph Priestley. In 1779, James Boswell wrote, "In Leeds, where one would not expect it, there is a very good public library, where strangers are treated with great civility."

The library moved twice before settling in the purpose built premises on Commercial Street, Leeds on 4 July 1808. This building is a grade II* listed Greek Revival building by Thomas Johnson with major 1880-81 extension to the rear by Thomas Ambler.

 the library has over 1000 members who pay an annual subscription. The library is estimated to have a stock of over 140 000 titles with 1,500 new books being added annually. It also contains more modern items such as audiobooks and DVDs.  The library's extensive collection is frequently used by researchers who are not members.

The library holdings also incorporate the stock of the short lived Leeds Foreign Library. The Foreign Library was founded in 1778 and incorporated into the Leeds Library in 1814.

The library is the setting for much of Frances Brody's 2014 novel Death of an Avid Reader.

See also
Grade II* listed buildings in Leeds
Listed buildings in Leeds (City and Hunslet Ward - northern area)

References

Further reading
  (includes history of the library)

Materials relating to Africa at the Leeds Library by Martin Banham, Leeds African Studies Bulletin, 78 (2017)

External links
Official website
Facebook page
Twitter page
 Association of Independent Libraries directory entry
 
The Leeds Library, Registered Charity no. 1114386 at the Charity Commission

Libraries in West Yorkshire
Grade II* listed buildings in West Yorkshire
Listed buildings in Leeds
1768 establishments in England
Buildings and structures completed in 1808
Subscribing libraries in the United Kingdom
Subscription libraries in England
Leeds Blue Plaques